Rae Sremmurd ("Ear Drummers" spelled backwards) is an American hip hop duo originating from Tupelo, Mississippi, formed by two brothers, Slim Jxmmi and Swae Lee. In 2013, they signed a record deal with Mike Will Made It's EarDrummers imprint. In January 2015, the duo released their debut album, SremmLife, which was certified platinum by the Recording Industry Association of America (RIAA). In August 2016, the duo released their second album, SremmLife 2.  During that same year, the duo also created their own record label, called SremmLife Crew Records. The duo is best known for their single "Black Beatles" from SremmLife 2, which topped the US Billboard Hot 100, while also charting internationally in the top ten in many countries. The duo also released other platinum-certified singles such as "No Type", "No Flex Zone" and "Swang". Their third studio album, SR3MM, was released on May 4, 2018, and served as a triple album. Their fourth studio album, Sremm4Life is scheduled for release on April 7, 2023.

Biography

Early life
Aaquil Iben Shamon "Slim Jxmmi" Brown and his younger brother, Khalif Malik Ibn Shaman "Swae Lee" Brown, were born in Whittier, California.

Their mother Bernadette Walker worked for the United States Army and her family was frequently relocated, with stays in Mississippi, Maryland, and Texas. Slim Jxmmi and Swae Lee started practicing, dancing, and writing music together at an early age.

While they were in middle school, the family moved to the Ida Street housing projects in Tupelo, Mississippi, to join Walker's new companion, a man named Floyd Sullivan.

2008–2012: Career beginnings and Dem Outta St8 Boyz
The Brown brothers met Jemiah Middlebrooks in Tupelo while he was playing basketball at a local park. They decided to found a hip hop band called "Dem Outta St8 Boyz" with him. Aaquil took the stage name "CaliBoy," Khalif "Kid Krunk," and Jemiah "Lil Pantz." They used money from their part-time jobs to buy equipment and to produce music at home. The two brothers were composing their own beats and the trio were rapping. Visibly inspired by Soulja Boy Tell'Em, the boys released songs and dance videos on social media. It was at the same time that the group first met, and then later became friends with Jermarcus Jackson, aka JJ (today known as Jay Sremm), a young disc jockey, who was studying at Tupelo High School with the two brothers. He since became the DJ of the group.

Shortly after, Bernadette Walker and her companion split up. Following the breakup, the two brothers started skipping school and working more seriously on music. They would return home at late hours, even when they had school the next morning. Their mother, fed up with their schedules, eventually kicked them out of her house, leaving them homeless. They began squatting in an abandoned house in the city with a friend of their stepfather's. They took advantage of the opportunity and organized parties in their new home in order to spread their music.

At the beginning of 2010, the group released the single "Party Animal", which gave them a local fame, allowing them to perform at local festivals and to broadcast their tracks on local radios. Thanks to their savings, the group took part in the auditions of the "Wild Out Wednesday" segment on BET's show 106 & Park in Memphis, Tennessee and succeeded to qualify. They participated on the show of December 8 in New York City and performed "Party Animal". Later, the group met a young rapper, named Andre "King Dre" Harris (today known as BoBo Swae), while he was freestyling in the high school courtyard. Andre, originally from West Point, Mississippi, started collaborating with the trio. Months later, the group finally released their first project, distributed locally.

In the middle of 2011, Lil Pantz left the group due to legal problems and was replaced by Andre. Aaquil and Khalif took the opportunity to change their stage names from "CaliBoy" and "Kid Krunk" to "Weirdo" and "Kid The Great," respectively. In August 2011, the trio once again participated in 106 & Park and performed an original song "My Diddy". They finished second place overall in the competition, and arranged meetings with representatives from record labels Def Jam Recordings and Sony Music. However, they did not sign any record deals at that time.

Around this time, Jemarcus put the group in touch with producer Pierre "P-Nazty" Slaughter, a cousin of his, who had grown up in Tupelo but had moved to Atlanta to work with Mike Will Made It's record label EarDrummers. P-Nazty appreciated the teenagers' music and decided to work with them. Thereby, the three rappers left Tupelo and spent a few months with P-Nazty and Marquel "Marz" Middlebrooks (another EarDrummers producer) in Georgia. They took the opportunity to perform in talent shows and recorded the track "I Dip", produced by Marz, and which increased their popularity a little more. They released their second project "Three Stooges Mixtape" at the beginning of 2012.

Unfortunately, due to financial problems, the boys had to return to their hometown, causing the group to temporarily dissolve. The brothers began working to save money; Aaquil worked at a mattress factory, and Khalif worked at a fast food restaurant where he served burgers. They were working about 12 hours per day. When Aaquil turned 21, he rented an apartment into which Khalif and Andre moved. They began recording music and organizing parties on weekends again. Despite this, the rappers had problems with the police due to noise complaints and with their landlord when they stopped mowing their lawn. Meanwhile, P-Nazty and Marz, aware of the potential and motivation of the trio, tried to convince the rappers to leave their work and to return to Atlanta to try again to succeed in music. After that Aaquil resigned, anticipating that he wouldn't pass a drug test, the trio decided to return to Atlanta thanks to Andre, who had a car.

2013–2015: Early success and SremmLife

Back in Georgia, the group worked a lot, performed in local shows, and got attention in the Atlanta indie hip hop scene. P-Nazty introduced them to Mike Will Made It, who decided to sign them on his indie label, Made-It Mafia. In the meantime, King Dre decided to leave the group due to familial reasons and moved to Florida to focus on his studies.
The now-duo decided to change their stage names again. The group took as their new name "Rae Sremmurd", derived from Mike Will Made It's production team "EarDrummers" by spelling both words backwards. Aaquil chose the name of "Slim Jimmy" (later stylized as "Slim Jxmmi"), and Khalif opted for first "iHipster Lee" then a few months later "Swae Lee." When Mike Will Made It finalized the creation of his major label "EarDrummers Entertainment" in partnership with Interscope Records, the two brothers became the first artists to sign.

Rae Sremmurd was discovered by the hip hop audience in December 2013, due to their appearance on Mike Will Made It's mixtape "#MikeWiLLBeenTriLL" on the track "We". The track was released as the duo's first promotional single two months later. They also released their second single, "Throw Sum Mo" in the same period. These two songs gave them the opportunity to perform at local clubs and to appear on radio.

In March, they participated in the South by Southwest music festival with Mike Will Made It and performed their first official single, "No Flex Zone", for the first time. At the end of the month, the track was releasing to digital retailers and progressively became popular. The music video of the song was released on August 11, with a guest appearance by American comedian Mike Epps. Finally, the single entered the Billboard Hot 100 on the chart issue dated August 16 and peaked at number 36 on September 20. They also released a remix of the track featuring American rappers Pusha T and Nicki Minaj which helped to increase its popularity. The group was invited to perform the hit single during 2014 BET Hip Hop Awards ceremony, their first performance at a major event.

In the middle of September, they released their second single "No Type" along with its music video shot in Venice Beach. The Mike Will Made It and Swae Lee-produced track quickly became more popular than "No Flex Zone" and entered the U.S. Hot 100 on the chart issue dated October 11 and climbed to number 16 at the beginning of December. It is also the duo's first single to chart outside the US, charting in numerous European countries. Both singles were certified platinum by the Recording Industry Association of America (RIAA) on January 28, 2015. In October, Brooklyn music producer Baauer released the track "One Touch" featuring AlunaGeorge and Rae Sremmurd as lead single from his EP ß. The song failed to chart but was the first collaboration of major artists with the Tupeloan brothers.

In early December, the duo announced the release of their debut album, SremmLife (originally announced as an EP) on January 6, 2015 and re-released "Throw Sum Mo" as their third single, adding guest vocals of Young Thug and Nicki Minaj to promote the project. The new single debuted at number 92 on the Billboard Hot 100 on January 17 and peaked at number 30 in its fifteenth week of gradually climbing up the chart.

2015 was the breakthrough year for Rae Sremmurd. SremmLife was welcomed with surprise and enthusiasm from public and music critics. Pushed by the success of the two first singles, the album debuted at number five on the Billboard 200 chart, with first-week sales of 49,000 copies, powered by 34,000 in traditional album sales. It received positive reviews from music journalism praising the energy and the cleverness of the duo. At the same time, Swae and Jxmmi received their first certifications with the platinum certifications of the two first singles of the album by the Recording Industry Association of America (RIAA) on January 28, 2015.

In May, they released "This Could Be Us" as the fourth single off their project with a music video shot during a trip in South Africa. The track peaked at number 49 on the Hot 100 in September. In June, Ty Dolla Sign teamed up with the duo and Future on his DJ Spinz produced single "Blasé" which peaked at number 63 in November. In July, they participated in their first concert tour as opening acts to Nicki Minaj's North American leg of "The Pinkprint Tour" along with Meek Mill, Dej Loaf and Tinashe.

Shortly after Minaj's tour, they debuted their own first worldwide concert tour, "SremmLife Tour". The tour began in September and brought them to Oceania, American colleges and finally Europe at the end of the year. During the Oceanian leg of the tour, they released the fifth and last single off "SremmLife", "Come Get Her" along with its music video. It peaking at number 56 on the Billboard Hot 100 in November.

Increasingly popular, the duo was nominated for numerous musical awards ceremonies during the year, including the BET Awards, the Billboard Music Awards, and the BET Hip Hop Awards, and won their first award, the BET Award for Best Group in June.

At the end of 2015, "SremmLife" had been nominated by numerous magazines as one of the best albums of the year. Complex ranked the album as the third best of the year. This decision sparked a feud between the duo and Hot 97 radio presenter Ebro Darden, who thought that the album should not appear on the list.

SremmLife was finally certified platinum in June 2016, along with the three last singles of the album.

2016–2018: SremmLife 2 and SR3MM

On June 16, 2016, Rae Sremmurd announced that their next album, SremmLife 2, would be released on August 12, 2016. The album included their first Billboard Hot 100 number-one song "Black Beatles", which topped the chart in the issue dated November 26, 2016. It also gave Gucci Mane his first number one.

The two brothers began working on their own solo albums. Slim Jxmmi announced his "Uncle Jxm" project, and on August 12, 2016, Swae Lee announced his debut solo album, Swaecation. Swae Lee also announced that the two brothers were working on a new album, called SremmLife 3. On August 4, 2017, the duo released a new single titled "Perplexing Pegasus".

In early 2018, Rae Sremmurd and Mike Will Made It announced that Swae Lee and Slim Jxmmi would release their solo albums—Swaecation and Jxmtroduction—in the same package as SremmLife 3, as a triple album package called SR3MM. The duo released "T'd Up" as SremmLife 3s second single on February 5, 2018, and released three singles from SR3MM on March 1, 2018 - Swae Lee's "Hurt to Look", Slim Jxmmi's "Brxnks Truck", and the duo's "Powerglide" featuring previous collaborator Juicy J. On May 4, 2018, the duo released SR3MM, a triple disc set that included solo projects for each of the members. Overall, SR3MM received mainly positive reviews from critics.

2022–present: Sremm4Life
On May 31, 2022, the brothers teased their upcoming fourth studio album, titled Sremm4Life. They followed this up on June 6 with announcing their first single of the album, and first release since 2018, "Denial," which was released in addition to a music video, on June 8, 2022. The second single, "Community D**k" featuring Flo Milli was released with an accompanying music video on August 8. A third single, "Torpedo" was released with an accompanying music video on December 30. The fourth single, "Sucka or Sum," along with its music video released on January 27, 2023.

On March 9, the release date for Sremm4Life was announced for April 7. On March 10, 2023, the fifth single "Tanisha (Pump That)" was released.

SremmLife Crew RecordsSremmLife Crew Records is a record label founded by Rae Sremmurd in 2016. They signed Mississippi native rappers with whom they worked before their major success. The label's first official release was the collective project Trail Mix in March 2016, introducing all members of the crew.

ArtistsIn-house disc jockeys'''
 Jay Sremm
 DJ Jon Wells
 Uncle Jxm (Slim Jxmmi pseudonym as DJ)

Releases
The following is the list of all albums released through SremmLife Crew Records.

Discography

 SremmLife (2015)
 SremmLife 2 (2016)
 SR3MM (2018)
 Sremm4Life (2023)

Awards and nominations
BET Awards
Rae Sremmurd has been nominated for seven BET Awards and won one award.

!
|-
|rowspan="3"|2015
|"Throw Sum Mo"(with Nicki Minaj and Young Thug)
|Coca-Cola Viewers' Choice Award
| 
| style="text-align:center;" rowspan="3"|
|-
|rowspan="4"|Rae Sremmurd
|Best New Artist
| 
|-
|rowspan="3"|Best Group
|
|-
|rowspan="1"|2016
|
| style="text-align:center;" rowspan="1"|
|-
|rowspan="3"|2017
| 
|style="text-align:center;" rowspan="3"|
|-
|rowspan=2|"Black Beatles"(with Gucci Mane)
|Best Collaboration
| 
|-
|Coca-Cola Viewers' Choice Award
| 

BET Hip Hop Awards
The BET Hip Hop Awards are hosted annually by BET for hip hop performers, producers and music video directors.

!
|-
|rowspan="2"|2015
|Rae Sremmurd
|Who Blew Up Award
|rowspan="2" 
| style="text-align:center;" rowspan="2"|
|-
|"No Type"
|People's Champ Award

Billboard Music Awards
The Billboard Music Award is an honor given by Billboard, a publication and music popularity chart covering the music business. Rae Sremmurd has won one award from five nominations.

!
|-
| 2015
|rowspan="1"|Rae Sremmurd
|rowspan="2"|Top Rap Artist
|rowspan="3" 
| style="text-align:center;" rowspan="1"|
|-
|rowspan="4"|2017
|rowspan="1"|Rae Sremmurd
| style="text-align:center;" rowspan="4"|
|-
|rowspan="3"|"Black Beatles"(with Gucci Mane)
| Top Rap Song
|-
| Top Rap Collaboration
| 
|-
| Top Streaming Song (Video)
| 
|-

International Dance Music Awards

!
|-
| 2016
| "Throw Sum Mo"(with Nicki Minaj and Young Thug)
| Best Rap/Hip Hop/Trap Dance Track
| 
| style="text-align:center;" rowspan="1"|

MTVU Woodie Awards
The MTVU Woodie Awards are semi-annual awards presented by MTVU which it states recognizes "the music voted best by college students."

!
|-
| 2015
| Rae Sremmurd
| Artist To Watch
| 
| style="text-align:center;" rowspan="1"|

Nickelodeon Kids' Choice Awards
The Nickelodeon Kids' Choice Awards, is an annual awards show that airs on the Nickelodeon cable channel, that honors the year's biggest television, movie, and music acts, as voted by Nickelodeon viewers.

!
|-
|2017
|Rae Sremmurd
|Favorite New Artist
|
|

Southern Entertainment Awards

!
|-
|rowspan="2"|2015
| SremmLife| Album Of The Year
|rowspan="2" 
| style="text-align:center;" rowspan="2"|
|-
| Rae Sremmurd
| Group / Label Of The Year
|-

Tours

Headlining tours
SremmLife Tour (2015)
SremmLife II Tour (2016–2017)

Supporting act
Nicki Minaj's The Pinkprint Tour (2015)
Lil Wayne's The Dedication Tour (2016)
Beyonce's Formation World Tour (2016)
The Weeknd's Starboy: Legend of the Fall Tour (2017)
 Wiz Khalifa's Dazed & Blazed Tour (2018)
Childish Gambino's This Is America Tour (2018)
 Post Malone's Twelve Carat Tour'' (2023)

References

External links

African-American musical groups
American hip hop groups
American musical duos
Hip hop duos
Musical groups established in 2008
Musical groups from Atlanta
Musical groups from Mississippi
People from Tupelo, Mississippi
Rappers from Atlanta
Rappers from Mississippi
Sibling musical duos
Southern hip hop groups
Pop-rap groups
Tupelo High School alumni
Interscope Records artists
2008 establishments in Mississippi
Trap musicians